Classical Gas is an album by Australian guitarist Tommy Emmanuel with the Australian Philharmonic Orchestra. The album peaked at number 6 on the ARIA Charts, becoming Emmanuel's second top ten album. The album was certified gold in Australia.

At the ARIA Music Awards of 1996, the album was nominated for the ARIA Award for Best Adult Contemporary Album but lost to Romeo's Heart by John Farnham.

Track listing

Personnel
Tommy Emmanuel – guitar
Rob Little - Bass
Kevin Murphy - Drums
Rex Goh - Electric Guitar
James Roche - Keyboards
Australian Philharmonic Orchestra
Slava Grigoryan – guitar (Track 11)

Charts

Certifications

References

1996 albums
Tommy Emmanuel albums
Columbia Records albums
Classical crossover albums